Coufal site (25HW6) is an archaeological site in the U.S. state of Nebraska. It was declared a National Historic Landmark in 1964. 

Located northwest of Cotesfield, the site is that of a large precontact Native American village dating to about 1100 CE, in the Central Plains tradition, believed to be intermediate between the Nebraska culture and the Upper Republican culture. The site includes at least 22 earth lodge sites.

See also
List of National Historic Landmarks in Nebraska
National Register of Historic Places in Howard County, Nebraska

References

Geography of Howard County, Nebraska
National Historic Landmarks in Nebraska
Archaeological sites on the National Register of Historic Places in Nebraska
National Register of Historic Places in Howard County, Nebraska
Plains Village period